Erik Aschehoug (29 March 1926 – 27 March 2001) was a French rower. He competed in the men's eight event at the 1948 Summer Olympics.

References

1926 births
2001 deaths
French male rowers
Olympic rowers of France
Rowers at the 1948 Summer Olympics
Sportspeople from Neuilly-sur-Seine